is a Japanese football player. He plays for Azul Claro Numazu.

Career
Shimon Watanabe joined Prefectural Leagues club Leven Pro in 2013. From 2014, he played for Australian club North Star and Far North Queensland. In 2017, he backed to Japan, and joined J3 League club Azul Claro Numazu in 2017. On June 21, he debuted in Emperor's Cup (v Kyoto Sanga FC).

References

External links

1990 births
Living people
Juntendo University alumni
Association football people from Hiroshima Prefecture
Japanese footballers
J3 League players
Azul Claro Numazu players
Association football defenders